Miodowa Street (Polish - Ulica Miodowa) is a 1777 oil on canvas painting by Bernardo Bellotto, then court painter to Stanisław August Poniatowski, king of Poland. Now in the Royal Castle, Warsaw, it is one of a series of twenty-two images of Warsaw by this artist and shows the junction of Miodowa Street with Senatorska Street (Ulica Senatorska). On the left is the Krakow Episcopal Palace and the now-lost 1774 Tepper Palace designed by Ephraim Schröger.  On the right is the Branicki Palace and Krasiński Palace

The series was housed in the Royal Castle, Warsaw until 1822 before being taken to Russia then returned to Poland in 1922. The painting of Miodowa Street was used as evidence for the reconstruction of the Branicki Palace and the Episcopal Palace after World War Two.

Bibliography
 Malarstwo Polskie, AURIGA, Warszawa, 1984

1777 paintings
Paintings in the collection of the Royal Castle, Warsaw
Paintings by Bernardo Bellotto